The Money Mill is a 1917 American silent drama film directed by John S. Robertson and starring Dorothy Kelly, Evart Overton and Gordon Gray.

Cast
 Dorothy Kelly as Helen Ogden 
 Evart Overton as Jack Burton 
 Gordon Gray as Richard Drake 
 Edward Elkas as Gregory Drake 
 Charles Kent as Reverend Dr. Granger 
 Logan Paul as Thomas Ogden 
 Mr. McCormack as John King 
 Mae Costello as Mrs. King 
 Mr. Sterrer as Carter McGee

References

Bibliography
 Slide, Anthony. The Big V: A History of the Vitagraph Company. Scarecrow Press, 1987.

External links
 

1917 films
1917 drama films
1910s English-language films
American silent feature films
Silent American drama films
American black-and-white films
Films directed by John S. Robertson
Vitagraph Studios films
1910s American films